Antennaria stenophylla is a North American species of flowering plants in the family Asteraceae known by the common name narrowleaf pussytoes. It is native to the Great Basin, Columbia Plateau, and Snake River Plain of the Western United States, in the States of Washington, Oregon, Idaho, Nevada, and Utah.

Antennaria stenophylla is a relatively small plant up to 15 cm (6 inches) tall. Male and female flower heads are on separate plants, with several heads clumped together on each stalk. The species usually grows on hillsides in sagebrush steppes, frequently dominated by sagebrush (Artemisia spp.).

References

External links
Turner Photographics Wildflowers of the Pacific Northwest photos and distribution map
Paul Slichter, Pussytoes of the Columbia River Gorge of Oregon and Washington, Narrowleaf Pussytoes photos and description
Calphotos Photos gallery, University of California

stenophylla
Alpine flora
Plants described in 1898
Flora of the Western United States
Flora without expected TNC conservation status